Joyraz Sheik (born 21 September 1996) is a Bangladeshi cricketer. 

He has played first-class cricket irregularly for Dhaka Division since 2015. In December 2015 he was named in Bangladesh's squad for the 2016 Under-19 Cricket World Cup. He made his Twenty20 debut on 11 June 2021, for Partex Sporting Club in the 2021 Dhaka Premier Division Twenty20 Cricket League.

References

External links
 
 

1996 births
Living people
Bangladeshi cricketers
Cricketers from Dhaka
Sheikh Jamal Dhanmondi Club cricketers
Old DOHS Sports Club cricketers
Partex Sporting Club cricketers
Dhaka Division cricketers